The Exciters is a 1923 American silent romantic comedy film produced by Famous Players-Lasky and distributed through Paramount Pictures. It is based on a 1922 Broadway play of the same name by Martin Brown. This film was directed by Maurice Campbell and stars Bebe Daniels, then a popular Paramount contract star. On the Broadway stage, Bebe Daniels's role of Ronnie Rand was played by Tallulah Bankhead.

Plot
As described in a film magazine review, Ronnie Rand, a young woman who loves excitement of all kinds and whose watchword is speed, is obliged to marry by a certain day or lose a rich inheritance. Through dramatic circumstances, she meets Pierre Martel, a member of a band of crooks. Thinking that he is a man's man, Ronnie marries him. Martel's confederates seek to blackmail Ronnie and when she refuses to sign a check, they attempt to kill Martel, but he is saved by the police. It then develops that Martel is no crook at all, but is a United States Secret Service agent who was obtaining evidence against the crooks. Ronnie, somewhat disappointed that her husband is no burglar, makes the best of it and both husband and wife are happy.

Cast

Preservation
With no prints of The Exciters located in any film archives, it is a lost film.

References

External links 

Lantern slide (Wayback Machine)
Antonio Moreno and Bebe Daniels

1923 films
American silent feature films
Lost American films
Paramount Pictures films
1923 romantic comedy films
American romantic comedy films
Films with screenplays by Sonya Levien
American black-and-white films
Films directed by Maurice Campbell
1923 lost films
Lost romantic comedy films
1920s American films
Silent romantic comedy films
Silent American comedy films
1920s English-language films